Groats (or in some cases, "berries") are the hulled  kernels of various cereal grains, such as oat, wheat, rye, and barley. Groats are whole grains that include the cereal germ and fiber-rich bran portion of the grain, as well as the endosperm (which is the usual product of milling).

Groats can also be produced from pseudocereal seeds such as buckwheat.

Culinary uses
Groats are nutritious but hard to chew, so they are often soaked before cooking. Groats are used in soups and porridges.

Groats of many cereals are the basis of kasha, a porridge-like staple meal of Eastern Europe and Eurasia. In North America kasha or kashi usually refers to roasted buckwheat groats in particular.

In North India, cut or coarsely ground wheat groats are known as dalia and are commonly prepared with milk into a sweet porridge or with vegetables and spices into salty preparations.

Parboiled and cut durum wheat groats, known as bulgur, are an essential ingredient of many Middle Eastern dishes such as mansaf and tabbouleh.

Groats are also used in some sausages, such as black puddings. A traditional dish from the Black Country in England is groaty pudding (not to be confused with groats pudding). Groaty pudding is made from soaked groats, leeks, onions, beef, and beef stock, and baked up to 16 hours; it is a traditional meal on Guy Fawkes Night.

Sliced oat groats are known as steel-cut oats, pinhead oats, coarse or Irish oatmeal.

Coarse barley flour is made by milling barley groats.

Production

The grain is cleaned, sorted by grain, size and peeled (if necessary) before being hulled. Additionally, the grains can be sliced on a "groat cutter", which can be adjusted to cut fine, medium, or coarse groats. Regardless, thereafter the groats are freed from any adhering parts of the shell by a brushing machine. In the case of cut groats, their fragments are sorted according to size by sieving.

Types of groats
Oat groats (a good source of avenanthramide)
Millet groats
Wheat groats, such as durum wheat groats, like bulgur
Buckwheat groats (though buckwheat is a pseudocereal rather than a true cereal)

See also

 List of porridges
 Groat sausage

References

Cereals
Porridges
Oats